Perigrapha may refer to:

 Perigrapha (fungus), a genus of fungi in the order Arthoniales
 Perigrapha (moth), a genus of moths in the family Noctuidae